Drillia adusta is a species of sea snail, a marine gastropod mollusk in the family Drilliidae.

Description

Distribution
This species occurs in the demersal zone of the Pacific Ocean off Colombia.

References

  Tucker, J.K. 2004 Catalog of recent and fossil turrids (Mollusca: Gastropoda). Zootaxa 682:1–1295

External links
  W.H. Dall (1909),  Report on the collection of shells from Peru ;Proceedings of the United States National Museum, Vol. 37, pages 147–294, with Plates 20–28

adusta
Gastropods described in 1834